Novonadezhdovka is a rural locality (a selo) in Kardonovsky Selsoviet, Kizlyarsky District, Republic of Dagestan, Russia. The population was 69 as of 2010.

Geography 
Novonadezhdovka is located 18 km east of Kizlyar (the district's administrative centre) by road. Nekrasovka and Kokhanovskoye are the nearest rural localities.

Nationalities 
Dargins and Avars live there.

References 

Rural localities in Kizlyarsky District